National Hispanic Heritage Month (Spanish: Mes nacional de la herencia hispana) is annually celebrated from September 15 to October 15 in the United States for recognizing the contributions and influence of Hispanic Americans to the history, culture, and achievements for the United States.

History
Hispanic Week was established by legislation sponsored by Rep. Edward R. Roybal of Los Angeles and was signed into law by President Lyndon Johnson in 1968. In 1988, the commemorative week was expanded to a month (September 15 to October 15) by legislation sponsored by Rep. Esteban Edward Torres (D–CA), amended by Senator Paul Simon, and signed into law by President Ronald Reagan. September 15 was chosen as the starting point for the commemoration because it is the anniversary of the Cry of Dolores (early morning, 16 September 1810), which marked the start of the Mexican War of Independence and thus resulted (in 1821) in independence for the New Spain Colony (now Mexico and the Central American nations of  Guatemala, El Salvador, Costa Rica, Honduras, and Nicaragua) which became the Federal Republic of Central America.

The 30 day period also includes many dates of importance in the Hispanic community: Costa Rica, El Salvador, Guatemala, Honduras and Nicaragua celebrate their anniversary of independence on September 15; Mexico commemorates its independence on September 16; Chile commemorates its independence on September 18; and the celebration Columbus Day or Día de la Raza.

Hispanic Heritage Week was first proclaimed by President Johnson in 1968 in Presidential Proclamation 3869. Presidents Nixon, Ford, Carter, and Reagan gave annual proclamations for Hispanic Heritage Week between 1969 and 1988. National Hispanic Heritage Month was first proclaimed by President George H. W. Bush on September 14, 1989, in Presidential Proclamation 6021. Since 1989, all Presidents have given a Presidential Proclamation to mark Hispanic Heritage Month.

Military commemorations
National Hispanic Heritage Month is a time for the U.S. Military to honor both fallen and active-duty Hispanic Americans who served in the armed forces. Sixty-one people of Hispanic heritage have been awarded the Medal of Honor, two were presented to members of the Navy, 13 to members of the U.S. Marine Corps, and 46 to members of the U.S. Army.

During the month, the U.S. Army commemorates the longstanding and remarkable contributions that Hispanics have made in building and defending the nation. , 136,000 Hispanic soldiers serve, composing 13.8 percent of the Army. According to the official Army website, the goal during Hispanic Heritage Month is to celebrate the diverse and inclusive environment of the U.S. Army. Through coordinated efforts throughout the Army, this observance will be used to inform Army audiences and celebrate the contributions of Hispanic soldiers, civilians, and their families. The representation of Hispanic Americans on active duty has increased by 10 percentage points during the past 30 years. In 1985, it was three percent, and by 2016 it was 13.7 percent. 

The U.S. Navy celebrates Hispanic Heritage Month by honoring sailors of Hispanic heritage whose military service dates back to the Civil War. , approximately 59,000 active and reserve sailors of Hispanic heritage serve in the U.S. Navy and Marines.

Annual events
Established in 2013 by the Fayetteville Chamber of Commerce, the annual Northwest Arkansas Hispanic Heritage Festival is held in Fayetteville, Arkansas. 

The El Barrio Latin Jazz Festival in The Bronx, New York City is held annually in September to coincide with Hispanic Heritage Month.

The Smithsonian Institution hosts Hispanic Heritage Month events in Washington, D.C. One event is the Zoo Fiesta. In 2018, the Smithsonian National Museum of the American Indian hosted the Realm of the Jaguar a series of performances featuring dances of Bolivia, Mexico and Guatemala, in addition to mask making and traditional and contemporary ceramics."

The Hispanic Family Festival is held annually at Springdale Park in Springdale, Holyoke, Massachusetts.

The Official Latino Short Film Festival began in 2015.

The Hispanic Star, a platform created by the We Are All Human Foundation, hosted a virtual Hispanic Heritage Month kick-off in 2020 featuring artists such as Residente and Fonseca, as well as civic and corporate leaders. The program engaged leaders to discuss Hispanic heritage and pride, the community's reality and Hispanic success stories.  The organization also published a toolkit developed to help individuals and organizations join in the celebration. On April 15, 2021, they launched a 2021 version of their Hispanic Heritage Month toolkit for corporations, organizations and individuals to use in their planning for this month and calling for everyone to use and share it.

References

Bibliography

External links

Hispanic Heritage Month

Commemorative months
Hispanic and Latino American culture
Observances in Canada
Observances in the United States
September observances
October observances